Pococera cyrilla is a species of snout moth in the genus Pococera. The species was first described by William Schaus in 1922. It is found in Cuba.

References

Moths described in 1922
Epipaschiinae
Moths of Cuba
Endemic fauna of Cuba